The War Victory Cross order was a medal introduced by the Slovak Republic. The order was issued to Slovakian military personnel who had been in the armed forces for a minimum of 4 years. A total of 3,769 awards of all classes were made; of which 437 were to members of the German armed forces and 142 to those of Romania.

Notable recipients
 Karl Hermann Frank
 Ján Gerthofer
 Herbert Olbrich
 Oskar Dirlewanger

References

Orders, decorations, and medals of Slovakia
Military history of Slovakia during World War II